A Nhà thờ họ (chữ Nôm: 茹𠄜户) or từ đường is a Vietnamese traditional place of worship of a clan or its branches which established by male descendants of paternal line. This type of worship place is most commonly seen in northern Vietnam as well as middle Vietnam. 

After a clan is divided into branches by males of paternal line, the head of the main branch of a clan (trưởng tộc in Vietnamese) would lead the place where all clan members worship the primitive ancestor and store the primary genealogical book. This place would be called nhà thờ đại tôn. Other breaches of a clan would have their own nhà thờ họ in which the creators of these branches are worshipped; these nhà thờ họ are called nhà thờ chi họ.

The size and architecture of nhà thờ họ is depended on a clan financial capability, donations from each male clan members and the political status of clan elders. A nhà thờ họ is usually built follow the traditional 3 rooms house architecture in which the middle room is extended in the back so that a worship pedestal could be placed. The worship objects such as linh tọa (chair of the ghosts), giá gương (glass stand), and ngai (throne) will be placed in this worship pedestal. The ngai holds a vermilion-painted-and-gold-gilded box, which contains family genealogical book, and is covered by a piece of red cloth. This is the most sacred site of a nhà thờ họ, which people consider the gathering place of ancestors' soul.

An ancestral death anniversary will be held yearly at nhà thờ họ and this anniversary is usually used as an occasion to renew the relationship between clan members.

References

Further reading
 Hy V. Luong (2003), Postwar Vietnam: dynamics of a transforming society, Rowman & Littlefield.
  Shaun Kingsley Malarney (2002) Culture, ritual and revolution in Vietnam, University of Hawaii Press.

 
Religious buildings and structures in Vietnam
Vietnamese folk religion
Vietnamese words and phrases